Live in Chicago may refer to:

Albums
Live! in Chicago (Kenny Wayne Shepherd album)
Live in Chicago (The Apples in Stereo album), a live album by The Apples in Stereo
Live in Chicago, 1999, an album by Joan of Arc
Live in Chicago, by Family Groove Company (2008)
Live in Chicago (King Crimson album), a 2017 live album by King Crimson
Live in Chicago (Kurt Elling album), a live album by Kurt Elling
Live in Chicago (Luther Allison album), 1999
Live in Chicago 12.19.98, a live album by the Dave Matthews Band
...Live in Chicago, an album by Panic at the Disco
Live in Chicago (Ween album), a live album by Ween
Just Jug, an alternative title for the 1961 Gene Ammons albums Live in Chicago

EPs
Live in Chicago (EP), a live EP by Trey Anastasio

Videos
Live in Chicago (Jeff Buckley video), a live DVD by Jeff Buckley
Live in Chicago (Stevie Nicks video), a live DVD by Stevie Nicks